Port of Cabo Rojo or Cabo Rojo Port is located in Cabo Rojo, Pedernales, Dominican Republic.

Overview

Port of Cabo Rojo was built by the Aluminum Corporation of America (Alcoa) for exportation of bauxite and limestone.
Currently it has two installations for the Grapnel exportation with a Dolphin Harbor type. 

This terminal is operated by a Colombian company called Cementos Andino (Andino Concrete), and they handle operations to export clinker, limestone, bauxite and concrete.

Port information

 Location: 
 Local time: UTC−4 
 Weather/climate/prevailing winds:  From May 15 until September 15
 Climate: mostly sunny, tropical. Hurricane season runs from June to November 
 Prevailing winds: direction ENE–ESE
 Average temperature range: 28–30 °C

See also 
 List of ports and harbours of the Atlantic Ocean

References 
 Cabo Rojo Port (Spanish)

Cabo Rojo
Urban planning in the Dominican Republic
Buildings and structures in Pedernales Province